Christopher Richard Farren (born April 29, 1986) is an American musician originally from Naples, Florida. He was born in Michigan, where he lived until the age of 7, before relocating to Florida with his family. He is known for his work in the bands Fake Problems and Antarctigo Vespucci and as a solo artist.

Career
In 2005, Farren formed the indie rock band Fake Problems with local friends in Naples. The band would release 3 studio albums and several EPs before officially breaking up in 2014, following guitarist Casey Lee's departure from the band in 2012.

In 2014, Farren began selling a The Smiths parody t-shirt that featured a photo of actor Will Smith, actress Jada Pinkett Smith, and their two children Jaden and Willow. Following an appearance on The Tonight Show Starring Jimmy Fallon, in which Fallon gifted Farren's shirt to Will Smith, the shirt became fairly popular online.

After the dissolution of Fake Problems, Farren would go on to release a collaborative EP with Jeff Rosenstock titled Soulmate Stuff as the band Antarctigo Vespucci. Since 2014, Antarctigo Vespucci has released 2 full-length albums and 2 EPs.

Farren released an album of all-original Christmas songs titled Like A Gift From God Or Whatever in 2014, with tracks featuring other artists such as Sean Bonnette, Laura Stevenson, and Mae Whitman.

In 2016, Farren released his debut solo album, Can't Die, through SideOneDummy Records.

In 2018 and again in 2020, Farren would compose music for two episodes of the Cartoon Network cartoon, Craig of the Creek with the show's composer and Farren's frequent collaborator, Jeff Rosenstock.

His second solo album, Born Hot, was released on October 11, 2019 on Polyvinyl Records. In 2019, Farren announced The Born Hot Tour, his first headline tour as a solo musician. The tour began in January 2020 and concluded in February 2020 with a sold out concert in Los Angeles.

Discography

Fake Problems

Studio albums 

 2007: How Far Our Bodies Go (Sabot Productions)
 2009: It's Great to Be Alive (SideOneDummy Records)
 2010: Real Ghosts Caught on Tape (SideOneDummy Records)

EPs 

 2001: Too Much Like Home (For Documentation Only Records)
 2004: From a Fashion Standpoint (For Documentation Only Records)
 2005: Oh No! (self-released)
 2006: Spurs & Spokes (Sabot Productions)
 2006: Spurs & Spokes/Bull Matador (Sabot Productions)
 2008: Viking Wizard Eyes Wizard Full Of Lies (Good Friends Records)
 2013: Sugar EP (Fake Problems)

7" Singles 

 2009: Dream Team (SideOneDummy Records)
 2010: Soulless (SideOneDummy Records)
 2011: Songs For Teenagers (SideOneDummy Records)
 2015: Strange Emotions: Holy Attitude (self-released)

Antarctigo Vespucci

Studio albums 

 2015: Leavin' La Vida Loca (Quote Unquote Records)
 2018: Love in the Time of E-Mail (Polyvinyl Records)

EPs 

 2014: Soulmate Stuff (Quote Unquote Records)
 2014: I'm So Tethered (Quote Unquote Records)

Solo

Studio albums 

 2014: Like A Gift From God Or Whatever (self-released)
 2016: Can't Die (SideOneDummy Records)
 2019: Born Hot (Polyvinyl Records)
 2022: Death Don't Wait (Original Motion Picture Soundtrack) (Polyvinyl Records)

7" Singles 

 2015: Where U Are (Boyfriend Island Records)
 2020: FALL IN LOVE2NIGHT / PHANTOM FRIEND (Polyvinyl Records)

Non-Album Singles 

 2014: Ducks Fly Together (Chris Farren+Grey Gordon Split)
 2017: Be There 4 Ya (self-released)
 2018: The Way That I Love U Has Changed (self-released)

References

External links 

 Official website
 Chris Farren at Polyvinyl Records
 Antarctigo Vespucci on Bandcamp

1986 births
Living people
American punk rock musicians
21st-century American singers
Polyvinyl Record Co. artists